Loos station (called Crescent Island railway station until 1916) is on the Canadian National Railway mainline in Loos, British Columbia.  Via Rail's Jasper–Prince Rupert train calls at the station as a flag stop.

References

External links 
Via Rail Station Description

Via Rail stations in British Columbia